Strength in Numbers, is the fifth album from New York-based Calla.

Track listing
 "Sanctify" – 4:39
 "Defences Down" – 4:30
 "Sylvia's Song" – 3:55
 "Sleep in Splendor" – 5:22
 "Rise" – 3:58
 "Stand Paralyzed" – 3:21
 "Bronson" – 4:12
 "Malo" – 2:01
 "Malicious Manner" – 3:26
 "A Sure Shot" – 5:22
 "Le Gusta el Fuego" – 2:41
 "Simone" – 4:21
 "Dancers in the Dust" – 4:53

2007 albums
Calla (band) albums
Beggars Banquet Records albums